Hamal is the brightest star in Aries.

Hamal may also refer to:

 Hamal (surname), including a list of people with the name
 Hamal Castle, Rutten, Belgium
 Hamal Lake, Sindh, Pakistan
 Hamal, a name of the first month in the Solar Hijri calendar

See also 
 Khamal (disambiguation)
 Kamal (disambiguation)
 Hambal, also known as Hammal, a village in Iran
 Hamal 18, a 2004 American film
 Hamallayya or Hamallism, a religious order
 Hamall Þormóðsson, an 11th-century allsherjargoði of Iceland